Zachary Weckstein (born 28 December 1989 in San Diego) is an American film producer based in the Netherlands. He is the founder of Pearl Pictures Productions, an independent film production company launched in 2017. Weckstein's first feature film, The Host, was released in 2020. It is the first English-language Dutch feature film distributed worldwide.

Life and career
Weckstein was born on 28 December 1989 in San Diego, California. His grandparents, who are of Ashkenazi Jewish descent, settled in the United States in the 1900s. He had an interest in acting from an early age and performed in semi-professional theatre and musicals.

After relocating to Europe at age 13, Weckstein received his Bachelor's in International Business Administration from Europort Business School in Rotterdam, Netherlands, and a Master's in Filmmaking from the London Film School.

In February 2019, Weckstein was invited to be a panelist at the French Society of Cinematographers in Paris in order to represent the relationship between film producers and cinematographers. The panel also included English cinematographer and director Chris Menges, Scottish producer Iain Smith, and cinematographer Oona Menges.

Weckstein is director and executive head of production of Pearl Pictures Productions, an independent film production company which he formed in 2017. His first feature film, The Host, was released in 2020.

Filmography
 The Host (2020)

References

External links

 
 Pearl Pictures Productions
 Zachary Weckstein at the 40th London Film Critics Circle Awards, 2020

1989 births
Living people
21st-century American businesspeople
American film producers
Film producers from California
Alumni of the London Film School